Emerging and growth-leading economies (EAGLEs) are a grouping of key emerging markets developed by BBVA Research.  The EAGLE economies are expected to lead global growth in the next 10 years, and to provide important opportunities for investors.

EAGLEs 

EAGLEs is a grouping acronym created in 2010 by BBVA Research to identify all emerging economies whose contribution to world economic growth in the next ten years is expected to be larger than the average of the G6 economies (G7 excluding the U.S.). This is a dynamic concept where country members can change over time according to their forecasted performance relative to developed economies. The membership of the EAGLEs is subjected to a yearly revision and can change according to their forecasted economic performances relative to developed economies.

Other economic concepts
As world economic growth rotates from developed to developing countries, there has been increasing interest in identifying emerging markets that will become global leaders, as well as increasing the lobbying of some countries to be included in the BRIC definition. However, many economists have argued that the BRIC concept (Brazil, Russia, India and China) is outdated and have proposed alternative definitions. The EAGLEs concept is similar to other proposals in going beyond BRICs (such as the CIVETS, Next Eleven or 7 percent club) but its methodology differs from others' in several ways:
 It gives less relevance to economic size and population, which may be misleading.
 It focuses on the Incremental GDP (IGDP) economies will generate, instead of paying attention to the current or expected size of their GDP. This creates a situation in which having high GDP or a high growth rate is not enough on its own to make the country a key global player. It is a combination of both that really matters.
 The cut-off is explicit. In order to become an EAGLE member, each country's expected Incremental GDP in the next 10 years needs to be greater than the one anticipated for the average of the G6 economies, G7 excluding the U.S.
 It is not a closed group and the concept is not linked to an acronym formed by a given set of countries.
 The results are based on a shorter horizon – 10 years – than the ones considered in other cases, ranging from 20 to 50 years.

Over the years there have been several attempts to try to implement the economic concept that will best reflect the potential of emerging markets in the coming years. After BRIC concept was coined by Goldman Sachs in 2001, there were other endeavors to find the best grouping acronym such as: CIVETS, Next Eleven, 7 per cent club and the EAGLEs.

In January 2011, Goldman Sachs decided to re-define its current definition of emerging markets and proposed a new term "Growth Markets". The separation of Growth Markets from Emerging Markets is aimed to show the world's most dynamic economies – those that are at least contributing 1 per cent to global growth (outside of the Developed World). In the first approach, eight economies have been identified and they were: BRIC economies plus Mexico, South Korea, Turkey and Indonesia. This particular shift in terminology was initially proposed by BBVA Research (later followed by Goldman Sachs) with the aim of switching from the existing static concept to something more dynamic, that could better indicate market potential.

Nest 
As part of the EAGLEs proposal, the EAGLEs' Nest is a second set of countries with expected Incremental GDP in the next decade to be lower than the average of the G6 economies (G7 excluding the U.S.) but higher than Italy's (G6 Minimum), the country which is anticipated to contribute least to global growth within the G7. The membership of the EAGLEs' Nest is subject to a yearly revision and can change according to forecasted economic performances.

Three countries which would otherwise have met the criterion for the Nest were excluded: Iraq and Saudi Arabia because BBVA classifies them as frontier, not emerging markets; Iran was excluded due to sanctions and thus not a suitable target for investors. Iran would have been an EAGLE in 2012 and a nest in 2011 and 2013, Iraq and Saudi Arabia only qualified for the Nest.

Indexes 
On September 9, 2011, Dow Jones and BBVA launched two equity indexes that allow investing in leading companies traded in Emerging and Growth-Leading Economies (EAGLEs). There are two indexes, "Dow Jones BBVA EAGLEs" and "Dow Jones BBVA EAGLEs Optimized", both composed of a set of 50 companies.

The allocation by country is macro driven according to the contribution each EAGLE is going to make to incremental GDP within the group, in the next ten years. It is a dynamic index which changes its composition along with macro forecasts; hence it is an adaptive index when compared with other static peers. Revisions are made annually in March to update the indices compositions according to the latest macroeconomic forecasts. It is also a liquid index which provides a diversified exposure to Emerging Markets. In order to facilitate index replication by foreign investment firms, the sample of 50 companies is chosen from the Dow Jones Global Total Stock Market Index, plus HK and US listed Chinese companies.

See also 
Emerging market
Developed market 
World economy

References

External links 
 Bettina Wassener. The New York Times. 15/11/2010 New Term for Emerging Economies Is Suggested
 Jon Herskovitz. Reuters. 29/12/2010  Analysis: S.Africa, not just another BRIC in the wall
 James Newman. Business News Americas. 12/11/2010 BBVA adds its EAGLES to the BRIC, CIVETS debate – Regional
 Alicia García-Herrero, Daniel Navia, Mario Nigrinis. BBVA Research 15/12/2010 Why investors should focus on BBVA EAGLEs

Economic growth
Economic country classifications